Khas-Ochiryn Luvsandorj (1910 – November 16, 1937) was leader of the Mongolian People's Revolutionary Party (MPRP) from 1934 to 1936.  He was arrested in the summer of 1937 on charges of counterrevolution and was executed the following November.

Career
Luvsandorj was born in 1910 in Tüsheet Khan Province (present-day Shaamar district of Selenge Province). In 1926 he started work as a scribe in the local seal (administration) office.  He became Chairman of the Provincial Committee Mongolian Revolutionary Youth League in 1932, Chairman of the Selenge MPRP Committee in 1933, and Member of the Presidium and Secretary of the Mongolian People's Revolutionary Party in 1934.

In 1936 he was sent to the Soviet Institute of Oriental Studies.  He returned to Mongolia in the summer of 1937 on holiday and found himself swept up in the country's Stalinist purges. Accused of counterrevolution by the Interior Ministry's "Special Commission", he was seized as part of the first wave of mass arrests of 65 high ranking government officials and intelligentsia on the night of Sept 10, 1937.  He was sentenced and executed on November 16, 1937.

He was rehabilitated in 1962.

Notes

1910 births
1937 deaths
Mongolian communists
Mongolian People's Party politicians
20th-century executions by Mongolia
Soviet rehabilitations
People from Selenge Province
Executed Mongolian people
Great Purge victims from Mongolia
Executed communists